Thomas Maitland Snow, CMG (21 May 1890 – 24 January 1997) was a British diplomat.

Biography 
The son of Thomas Snow, of Cleve, Exeter, and Edith Banbury, Snow was educated at Winchester College, where was Exhibitioner and New College, Oxford, where he was Scholar and graduated BA in Classics.

He joined the Foreign Office in 1914 and served in Christiania (Oslo), Athens, Bern, Madrid, Warsaw, Tokyo, and Madrid. He was British Minister to Cuba from 1935 to 1937, British Minister to Finland from 1937 to 1940, British Minister to Colombia from 1941 to 1945 (Ambassador from 1944 to 1945), and British Minister to Switzerland from 1946 to 1949. He retired in 1950.

Snow was appointed CMG in 1934.

References 

1890 births
1997 deaths
20th-century British diplomats
British centenarians
Men centenarians
Place of birth missing
Place of death missing
People educated at Winchester College
Alumni of New College, Oxford
Ambassadors of the United Kingdom to Cuba
Ambassadors of the United Kingdom to Switzerland
Ambassadors of the United Kingdom to Finland
Ambassadors of the United Kingdom to Colombia